The Onerahi Causeway is a causeway in the Northland Region of New Zealand. It links the suburb of Onerahi with the city of Whangarei and is approximately 5 km long.

The causeway is built across the marshes and seabed of the upper Whangarei Harbour. It carries approximately 20,000 vehicles a day on Riverside Drive and is one of the regions busiest roads.

History

The Onerahi causeway was built between 1950 and 1953 by the Whangarei County due to a better link being needed between Whangarei and the areas of Onerahi, Parua Bay, Whangarei Heads and Whangarei Airport. The road that was existing at the time followed the northern shores of the Whangarei Harbour, with a series of small one lane bridges crossing the streams that entered the harbour, such as the Awaroa River, and Mackesy Stream. The old piles are still present today.

The construction involved draining areas of the harbour, such as the area inland of Kissing Point, and building up the road surface to avoid flooding during Spring Tides. This resulted in the new road being straight, very flat and requiring 3 bridges to be built. 
 
The construction of the causeway also included the laying of council infrastructure, such as sewerage and water supplies to Onerahi, and the eventual closure of the waste treatment works at Onerahi. 
The completed works greatly improved travel to Onerahi, which was neglected when the  Onerahi Branch Railway was closed in 1933.

In 2016, a cycleway was constructed along the causeway and involved some widening of the reclamation. The 6 km cycleway was built to link the Waimahanga Walkway and Hatea Loop, and reduce hazards to people walking and cycling from Onerahi to central Whangarei.

Future

The causeway carrying Riverside Drive is a major arterial route, linking the growing populations of Onerahi and Whangarei Heads to Whangarei. Provisions are set aside to four-lane the road by 2025, as it can become congested at peak times.
It is likely to be included into the planned Onerahi Bypass, when it is constructed.
The road also needs improved foundation works, due to the boggy nature of the area, potholes and bumps in the road are an issue.

See also
 Whangarei Harbour
 Whangarei
 Onerahi
 Onerahi Branch, the railway closure that lead to the causeway construction

References

Buildings and structures in Whangārei